Nimnayaka Hudekalawa (Alone in a Valley) is a 2017 Sri Lankan Sinhala drama film directed by Boodee Keerthisena and produced by his father Buddhi Keerthisena. It stars Saumya Liyanage and Sangeetha Weeraratne in lead roles along with Samanalee Fonseka and Ravindra Randeniya. Music composed by Lakshman Joseph De Seram. It is the 1277th Sri Lankan film in the Sinhala cinema.

The film cited as the last outing of Tissa Abeysekera before his death.

Plot

A creative director of an advertising agency going through an experience that he has never encountered. His wife being pregnant and waiting to give birth any moment, he has to be at office and sort out an urgent advertising campaign. While at the office he gets a phone call from his mother that wife is about to give birth and she is taking her to hospital. On his way to hospital, he encounters an experience. Through this experience he starts to fight with his desires and fears. He finally gets to the hospital and he experiences the unexpected.

- Boodee Keerthisena

Cast
 Saumya Liyanage as Vishwa
 Samanalee Fonseka as Maya
 Sangeetha Weeraratne as Thaaraka
 Palitha Silva as Army Officer
 Sachini Ayendra as Advertising Executive
 Vimukthi Jayasundara as Vishwa's Friend
 Ravindra Randeniya as The Client
 Tissa Abeysekera as Mysterious Man
 Jayalal Rohana as Supermarket cashier
 Kingsly Rathnayake as Weather Man
 Lakshman Mendis as Hermit

Soundtrack

References

External links

Official Facebook page
එකම සිනමා ශානරයකට කොටු වෙන්න මම කැමැති නැහැ
නිම්නයක හුදකලාව සිනමා විමසුම

2010s Sinhala-language films